The Callaway Plant is a nuclear power plant located on a  site in Callaway County, Missouri, near Fulton, Missouri. It began operating on December 19, 1984. The plant, which is the state's only commercial nuclear unit, has one 1,190-megawatt Westinghouse four-loop pressurized water reactor and a General Electric turbine-generator.  It is owned by the Ameren Corporation and operated by subsidiary Ameren Missouri. It is one of several Westinghouse reactors built to a design called Standard Nuclear Unit Power Plant System, or SNUPPS.

The plant produces 1,279 electrical megawatts (MWe) of net power. It has run continuously for over 500 days between refuelings, one of 26 U.S. reactors to do so.

History 
In 2001, Callaway set a plant record by producing 101.1 percent of its rated electrical output, ranking it among the world's top reactors, according to the Energy Information Administration. 

On November 19, 2005, its workers finished replacing all four steam generators in 63 days, 13 hours, a world record for a four-loop plant.

In 2008, Callaway produced about 19 percent of Ameren Missouri's power. 

In 2014, the Nuclear Regulatory Commission tests found contaminated ground water near the site.

The plant experienced three unplanned shutdowns during the last three quarters of 2020. On December 24, 2020, an electric fault on the non-safety main generator caused an extensive outage requiring the replacement of significant components. The components were replaced, inspected, and tested during subsequent months. According to NRC inspection reports, on August 2, 2021, the reactor was restarted. Two days later on August 4, 2021, the main turbine generator was synchronized with the electrical grid and on August 8, the plant reached rated thermal power.

Proposed Unit 2 and cancellation 
On July 28, 2008, Ameren Missouri applied to the U.S. Nuclear Regulatory Commission (NRC) for a Combined Construction and Operating License (COL) to build a 1,600-MW Areva Evolutionary Power Reactor. "Given projections for a nearly 30 percent increase in demand for power in Missouri in the next two decades, we believe we will need to build a large generating plant to be on line in the 2018–2020 timeframe," wrote Thomas R. Voss, the company's president and chief executive officer.

In April 2009, the proposal was cancelled. One stumbling block was a law that forbids utilities to charge customers for the interest accrued on a construction loan before a new plant produces electricity. The new nuclear reactor would have cost at least $6 billion.

In April 2012, Ameren Missouri and Westinghouse Electric Company announced their intent to seek federal funding for a new generation of nuclear reactors to be installed at the Callaway site. The U.S. Department of Energy could provide up to $452 million in research and development funds to Westinghouse. The new reactors would be smaller and, the companies claimed, safer in design than any currently operating. Ameren Missouri would apply to license up five of the 225-megawatt reactors at the Callaway site, more than doubling its current electrical output.

In August 2015, a month after Ameren had announced plans to build solar energy plants in Missouri, all plans to expand nuclear-powered electricity generation at the site were scrapped.

Electricity production

Facilities

Cooling tower 

It is 430 feet wide at the base, and is constructed from reinforced concrete. Another  of water are sent to the Missouri River as "blowdown" to flush solids from the cooling tower basin. All water lost through evaporation or blowdown is replaced with water from the river, located five miles from the plant. The tower is designed such that if it were to somehow topple over completely intact, it would not damage any of the critical plant structures.

Risks

Surrounding population 

The 2010 population within  of Callaway was 10,092, an increase of 3.8 percent in a decade, according to an analysis of U.S. Census data for msnbc.com. The 2010 population within  was 546,292, an increase of 15.0 percent since 2000. Cities within 50 miles include Fulton (11 miles to city center), Jefferson City (26 miles to city center), and Columbia (32 miles to city center).

Seismic risk 
In August 2010, the Nuclear Regulatory Commission's estimated that the annual chance that an earthquake might damage the core at Callaway was 1 in 500,000, the lowest probability of any U.S. reactor.

See also 

 List of power stations in Missouri

References

External links

Ameren's information page for Callaway
NRC Facility Info

Buildings and structures in Callaway County, Missouri
Energy infrastructure completed in 1984
Nuclear power plants in Missouri
Nuclear power stations using pressurized water reactors
Towers completed in 1984